Kruisstraat is a hamlet in the south of the Netherlands. It is located in the municipality of Halderberge, North Brabant, between the towns of Oudenbosch and Hoeven.

References

Populated places in North Brabant
Halderberge